Princess Soamsawali of Thailand, the Princess Suddhanarinatha, born Mom Luang Soamsawali Kitiyakara (on 13 July 1957), is a member of the Thai royal family, and is the former wife of her first cousin King Vajiralongkorn. She was titled "the Princess Mother of the King's First Grandchild" after her divorce with the then crown prince in 1991. She is also a niece of Queen Sirikit.

Biography
Princess Soamsawali was born on 13 July 1957 at Guy's Hospital in London, United Kingdom. She is the eldest child of Mom Rajawongse Adulyakit Kitiyakara. Her father was an elder brother of Queen Sirikit and her mother is Thanpuying Bandhu Savali Kitiyakara (born Princess Bandhu Savali Yugala). She has one younger sister, Mom Luang Sarali Kitiyakara, born 8 April 1966.

Her father was the second child of Prince Nakkhatra Mangkala Kitiyakara, the Prince of Chanthaburi II and Mom Luang Bua Snidvongs. Her mother was the daughter of Prince Bhanubandhu Yugala and Mom Luang Soiraya Snidvongs.

She first attended the primary level at Chitralada School, then moved to Chiang Mai with her father when he was a judge at the Chiang Mai Court. She moved to study at Regina Coeli College, the all-girls academy in Chiang Mai in 1967.

Personal life
On 3 January 1977, at the age of 19, she married her first cousin, Maha Vajiralongkorn, the only son of King Bhumibol Adulyadej. After their marriage, her official title became Her Royal Highness Princess Soamsawali, Royal Consort of His Royal Highness Crown Prince Maha Vajiralongkorn of Thailand. The couple had one daughter, Princess Bajrakitiyabha of Thailand, born on 7 December 1978. The marriage ended in divorce in 1991.

After her divorce from the crown prince, the king, by royal proclamation, gave her a new title on 12 August 1991. Her official full title became Phra Worarachathinatdamat, meaning the mother of the king's first grandchild (translated into English as The Princess Mother of the King's First Grandchild). She thus retained her title as princess and remains a member of the Thai royal family.

Princess Soamsawali has an adopted daughter, Siraphatchara Sophatcharamani or Bai Phlu.

Accomplishments

Since her divorce, Princess Soamsawali has performed many functions on behalf of the royal household. She has shown keen interest in public health and social welfare. The following Thai Red Cross Society programs are under her patronage:
 
 The "Reducing AIDS Infection from Mother to New-Born Baby" Programme.
 Medical Funding for AIDS patients.
 Funding for Reducing AIDS infection from Mother to the New-Born Baby.
 Milk funds for infants under the "Reduce AIDS effects from Mother to the New-Born Baby" Program.
 The Foundation of Professor Dr. Mom Rajawongse Galyanakit Kitiyakara.
 The Program of Life Giving to the Parents of AIDS-infected Babies.
 Funds for Cancer Treatment in Children
 The Princess Pa Foundation

Honours

National
:
  Dame of the Most Illustrious Order of the Royal House of Chakri
  Dame of the Ancient and Auspicious Order of the Nine Gems
  Dame Grand Cross (First Class) of The Most Illustrious Order of Chula Chom Klao
  Dame Grand Cordon (Special Class) of The Most Exalted Order of the White Elephant
  Dame Grand Cordon (Special Class) of The Most Noble Order of the Crown of Thailand
  Dame Grand Cross (First Class) of The Most Admirable Order of the Direkgunabhorn
  The Order of Symbolic Propitiousness Ramkeerati (Special Class) - Boy Scout Citation Medal
  King Rama IX Royal Cypher Medal (First Class)
  King Rama X Royal Cypher Medal (First Class)
  Commemorative Medal on the Occasion of the Coronation of H.M. King Rama X

Foreign decorations
:
 Grand Cross 1st Class of the Order of Merit of the Federal Republic of Germany (29 February 1984).
 Nepal: 
  Member of the Most Glorious Order of the Benevolent Ruler (12 December 1984).
 :
 Dame Grand Cross of the Royal Order of Isabella the Catholic (13 November 1987).
:
  Member First Class of the Order of the Sacred Treasure (26 September 1991).
 :
 Dame Grand Cross of the Order of Orange-Nassau (19 January 2004).

Ancestry

References

External links
 Princess Soamsavali Kitiyakara 
 Princess Foundation
 Wanjai

}

1957 births
Living people
Thai female Phra Ong Chao
Thai people of Mon descent
Mahidol family
Kitiyakara family
Dames Grand Cross of the Order of Chula Chom Klao
Dames Grand Cross of the Order of the Direkgunabhorn
Dames Grand Cross of the Order of Isabella the Catholic
Recipients of the Order of the Sacred Treasure, 1st class
People from Southwark
Princesses by marriage
Consorts of Vajiralongkorn
Thai princesses consort
20th-century Chakri dynasty
21st-century Chakri dynasty